Jefferson L. Ghrist (born March 14, 1975) is an American politician. He is a Republican member of the Maryland House of Delegates, representing District 36, based in Kent, Queen Anne's, Caroline, and Cecil Counties, Maryland, since 2015.

Career
Ghrist was first elected to political office in December 2010, when he became the President of the Caroline County Board of Commissioners. He would serve in this position until January 2012, after which he was succeeded by Wilbur Levengood. He once again became the President on January 2, 2014, succeeding Levengood.

On October 29, 2013, Ghrist filed paperwork to run for election to one of the three District 36 seats in the House of Delegates. In the primary, Ghrist defeated incumbent delegate Michael D. Smigiel Sr. with 17 percent of the vote, and went on to win the general election with 24.1 percent of the vote.

In the legislature
Ghrist has been a member of the House of Delegates since January 14, 2015. Since 2019, he has served as Deputy Minority Whip for the Maryland House Republican Caucus.

Committee assignments
 Appropriations Committee, 2015–present (health & human resources subcommittee, 2015–2017; oversight committee on personnel, 2015–present; capital budget subcommittee, 2016–present; health & social services subcommittee, 2017–2018; transportation & the environment subcommittee, 2019; education & economic development subcommittee, 2020–present)
 Joint Committee on Fair Practices and State Personnel Oversight, 2015–present
 Joint Covid-19 Response Legislative Work Group, 2020–present
 State Park Investment Commission, 2021–present
 Commission on Maryland Retirement Security and Savings, 2015–2016
 21st Century School Facilities Commission, 2016–2017

Other memberships
 House Chair, Caroline County Delegation, 2015–present
 Maryland Legislative Sportsmen's Caucus, 2015–present

Electoral history

References

Republican Party members of the Maryland House of Delegates
Living people
Place of birth missing (living people)
1975 births
21st-century American politicians
County commissioners in Maryland